Bob B Boilen (b. April 10, 1953 in Brooklyn, New York City) is an American musician and media personality. He is the host and creator of NPR's online music show All Songs Considered and NPR's Tiny Desk Concerts series. 

In 1979 Bob Boilen played synthesizers in the Washington, D.C. band Tiny Desk Unit. They were the first band to ever play the 9:30 Club at the original location at 930 'F' Street. From 1982 to 1986 Boilen filled a variety of roles including composer with Baltimore's Impossible Theater.  He has also worked as a producer for Channel 50, and produced Science Live for the Discovery Channel. Boilen was the director of the NPR show All Things Considered (1989–2007) and chose the music between the news stories for that show. Those musical snippets or "buttons" was the starting point for the creation of All Songs Considered.

Boilen created the Tiny Desk Concert series in April of 2008 for NPR Music, hosting intimate performances at his desk. The series curated by Boilen and the team of NPR Music was inspired by a comment made by NPR Music's Stephen Thompson when he jokingly invited musician Laura Gibson to perform at Bob's desk. The two of them went to see Gibson at a show at South by Southwest in 2008 and the loud crowd made it impossible to hear her. The name of the series is a play on the name Tiny Desk Unit, a band Boilen played in from 1979–1981.

Bob Boilen continues to play music with friend Michael Barron; both were founding members of the psychedelic dance band Tiny Desk Unit (1979–1981), for which Boilen played synthesizer. Boilen continues to write music with Barron in a band called Danger Painters and also writes and releases solo music. Boilen also composed the original theme music for Talk of the Nation. 

He voiced himself in "Gal of Constant Sorrow", a Season 27 episode of the animated television series The Simpsons.

References

External links 
 Bob Boilen's homepage

Living people
NPR personalities
1953 births
Musicians from Brooklyn
People from Brooklyn
American male composers
Radio personalities from New York City